Samuel Knutzen (15 January 1892 – 30 April 1975) was a Norwegian footballer. He played in one match for the Norway national football team in 1912.

References

External links
 

1892 births
1975 deaths
Norwegian footballers
Norway international footballers
Place of birth missing
Association footballers not categorized by position